The Courthouse Square Historic District in Centerville, Iowa, was placed on the National Register of Historic Places in 1997 through the efforts of the Centerville Historic Preservation Commission. The district consists of an area centered on the town square and bounded by Van Buren Street, Haynes Avenue, Maple Street and 10th Street. The Appanoose County Courthouse is located in the center of the Courthouse Square District.

References

External links
 

Geography of Appanoose County, Iowa
Centerville, Iowa
National Register of Historic Places in Appanoose County, Iowa
Historic districts on the National Register of Historic Places in Iowa
1997 establishments in Iowa